"Same Heart" is a 2014 song by Israeli recording artist Mei Finegold. 

Same Heart may also refer to:

Games
Doushin: Same Heart (同心 same heart) Japanese electronic game

Music
Ddokateun Mam (똑 같은 맘, "Same Heart")
"Same Heart", a 1986 song by Jennifer Rush in duet with Michael Bolton, written by Michael Bolton, from Passion and Stronghold – The Collector's Hit Box
"Same Heart", No.6 Dutch hit single by Laura Jansen